Erosio interdigitalis blastomycetica (EIB) is a skin condition caused by a Candida albicans infection, characterized by an oval-shaped area of macerated white skin on the web between and extending onto the sides of the fingers.

Signs and symptoms
It is common among bartenders and homemakers. EIB can be found on both the hands and feet. It is most common between the middle and ring finger and sometimes found between toes.

Cause
It is believed that EIB is caused by working with water often. It is not known exactly how long the infection will last since it varies often between people who have gotten infected. The most common symptoms are pruritus and discomfort while on rare occasions some do experience pain.

Treatment

History 
EIB was first discovered by 2 two scientists, Gougerot and Goncea in 1915. It was later named by another scientist Johannes Fabry in 1917.

See also 
 Candidiasis
 Skin lesion

References 

Mycosis-related cutaneous conditions